Blue Mance is an album by the jazz pianist Junior Mance, recorded in 1994 and released on the Chiaroscuro label the following year.

Reception

AllMusic noted that "this CD finds Mance and his colleagues in excellent form on well-known standards as well as some lesser-known gems".

Track listing
 "Falling in Love with Love" (Richard Rodgers, Lorenz Hart) - 5:36
 "Head Start" (Keter Betts) - 5:12
 "Emily" (Johnny Mandel, Johnny Mercer) - 8:10
 "Teach Me Tonight" (Gene de Paul, Sammy Cahn) - 5:21
 "Blue Monk" (Thelonious Monk) - 9:31
 "Blue Mance" (Junior Mance) - 7:35
 "Shepherd of the Night Flock" (Duke Ellington) - 5:42
 "If I Had You" (Jimmy Campbell, Reg Connelly, Ted Shapiro) - 5:52
 "I Wish I Knew How It Would Feel to Be Free" (Billy Taylor) - 8:52
 "Jazzspeak" - 9:07

Personnel
Junior Mance - piano 
Keter Betts - bass
Jackie Williams  - drums

References

1995 albums
Junior Mance albums
Chiaroscuro Records albums
Albums recorded at Van Gelder Studio